Ruairí Convery (born 5 January 1984) is a hurler from Northern Ireland who played as a right wing-forward at senior level for the Derry county team.  

Convery joined the panel during the 2003 National League and immediately became a regular member of the starting fifteen. Since then he has won two Nicky Rackard Cup medals and has ended up as an Ulster runner-up on two occasions. 

At club level Convery is a one-time county club championship medalist with Swatragh.

References

1984 births
Living people
Derry inter-county hurlers
Swatragh hurlers
Ulster inter-provincial hurlers